RTB Aneka (formerly known as RTB2) is the second oldest free-to-air terrestrial television channel in Brunei. The channel officially began broadcasting on 1 March 1976.

RTB Aneka broadcasts for from 10:00 until 23:00 BST Monday until Thursday & Saturday, from 08:00 until 23:00 BST Friday & Sunday followed by a satellite simulcast of  RTB Sukmaindera filling the rest of its broadcasting time. RTB Aneka mainly shows entertainment and variety programs as well as news during its broadcasting time.

On April 11, 2017, RTB2 along with sister station, RTB3 ceased brodcasing and merged to form RTB Aneka as part of RTB's rebranding project as well as broadcaster's shift from analogue into digital broadcasting.

References

External links
 About RTB Aneka at RTB official website

Television channels in Brunei
Malay language television stations
Television channels and stations established in 1976